The Derrynasaggart Mountains are a mountain range in counties Cork and Kerry, Ireland. They are situated from mid-Cork to Kerry, and can be seen on the N22 road in the Kerry direction. They are also viewable from towns like Clondrohid, Macroom and Ballyvourney (Baile Mhuirne)

Highest point – Mullaghanish 
The highest point is the mountain of Mullaghanish. It is located near Ballyvourney and it holds radio transmitters for RTÉ, TG4, Today FM, Radio Kerry and Newstalk.

See also  
Ballyvourney 
Mullaghanish

Mountains and hills of County Cork